Father Augustine Wetta,  (born January 20, 1971) is an American Benedictine monk, author, essayist, and public speaker. He was ordained a priest on September 27, 2003, and serves as chaplain to the Saint Louis Priory School where he also coaches rugby, and teaches Apologetics, English Literature, and Ethics.

Education
He graduated from Rice University with a BA in Classics. He graduated from Oxford University with a BA and MA in Theology.  He received an MA in English from Middlebury College.

Works
The Eighth Arrow,(2018) — Odysseus in the Undeworld
 Humility Rules (2017) - Saint Benedict's Twelve-Step Guide to Genuine Self-Esteem
Listening in Ferguson, 2015.
His Wide Mouth Home, 1999.

References

External links
Official website
Contagious Joy of Priesthood! | Fr. Augustine Wetta | Vocare | Shalom World

1971 births
Alumni of the University of Oxford
Living people
Rice University alumni